Minneapolis is a city in and the county seat of Ottawa County, Kansas, United States.  As of the 2020 census, the population of the city was 1,946.

History
The community was originally called Markley's Mills, and under the latter name was laid out in 1866. It was renamed Minneapolis about 1871, after Minneapolis, Minnesota. The railroad was built through Minneapolis in 1878.

Minneapolis had its own minor league baseball team called the Minnies in 1905, then from 1908 to 1909, and again in 1912, alternately as part of the Kansas State League or Central Kansas League.

Geography

Minneapolis is located at  (39.124719, -97.705209).

Area attractions
 Rock City park is located southwest of Minneapolis.

Demographics

Minneapolis is part of the Salina Micropolitan Statistical Area.

2010 census
As of the census of 2010, there were 2,032 people, 832 households, and 528 families living in the city. The racial makeup of the city was 96.1% White, 1.2% African American, 0.2% Native American, 0.1% Asian, 0.6% from other races, and 1.8% from two or more races. Hispanic or Latino of any race were 2.7% of the population.

There were 832 households, of which 32.1% had children under the age of 18 living with them, 48.8% were married couples living together, 10.2% had a female householder with no husband present, 4.4% had a male householder with no wife present, and 36.5% were non-families. 33.2% of all households were made up of individuals, and 16.7% had someone living alone who was 65 years of age or older. The average household size was 2.32 and the average family size was 2.94.

The median age in the city was 40 years. 26.4% of residents were under the age of 18; 5% were between the ages of 18 and 24; 23.6% were from 25 to 44; 24.3% were from 45 to 64; and 20.7% were 65 years of age or older. The gender makeup of the city was 50.4% male and 49.6% female.

2000 census
As of the census of 2000, there were 2,046 people, 810 households, and 512 families living in the city. The racial makeup of the city was 96.97% White, 1.32% African American, 0.24% Native American, 0.05% Asian, 0.29% from other races, and 1.12% from two or more races. Hispanic or Latino of any race were 1.52% of the population.

There were 810 households, out of which 29.6% had children under the age of 18 living with them, 53.1% were married couples living together, 8.0% had a female householder with no husband present, and 36.7% were non-families. 33.3% of all households were made up of individuals, and 18.9% had someone living alone who was 65 years of age or older. The average household size was 2.29 and the average family size was 2.92.

In the city, the population was spread out, with 22.9% under the age of 18, 7.5% from 18 to 24, 25.0% from 25 to 44, 21.5% from 45 to 64, and 23.1% who were 65 years of age or older. The median age was 41 years. For every 100 females, there were 91.0 males. For every 100 females age 18 and over, there were 88.2 males.

The median income for a household in the city was $34,792, and the median income for a family was $43,750. Males had a median income of $29,028 versus $21,174 for females. The per capita income for the city was $17,628. About 3.7% of families and 9.7% of the population were below the poverty line, including 8.4% of those under age 18 and 16.8% of those age 65 or over.

Education
The community is served by North Ottawa County USD 239 public school district.

Notable people
 George Washington Carver, who lived in the vicinity for a brief period.
 Alyssa George, former Miss Kansas 2007
 Bessie S. McColgin, Oklahoma businesswoman and politician
 Rollin Rees, former U.S. Representative from Kansas
 Frank "Cannonball" Richards, vaudeville and sideshow performer known for his acts involving hits to the gut, most famously getting shot with a cannonball
 Alexander Riddle, 11th Lieutenant Governor of Kansas and publisher of the Minneapolis Messenger newspaper

References

Further reading

External links

 City of Minneapolis
 Minneapolis - Directory of Public Officials
 Rock City, landmark
 Minneapolis city map, KDOT

Cities in Kansas
County seats in Kansas
Cities in Ottawa County, Kansas
Salina, Kansas micropolitan area